Magnetic pole may refer to:
 One of the two ends of a magnet
 Magnetic monopole, a hypothetical elementary particle
 The magnetic poles of astronomical bodies, a special case of magnets, especially:
 The North Magnetic Pole of planet Earth, a point where the north end of a compass points downward
 The South Magnetic Pole of planet Earth, a point where  the south end of a compass points downward